Fergestown is an unincorporated community in Williamson County, Illinois, United States.

References

Unincorporated communities in Williamson County, Illinois
Unincorporated communities in Illinois